= Cable Television Standards Council =

The Cable Television Standards Council of Canada was an independent organization established by the Canadian cable television industry to administer Standards, Codes and Guidelines that ensure high standards of customer service. In February 2002, Vidéotron withdrew from the CTSC [1]. Later that year, effective December 1, Shaw also withdrew [2]. "The CTSC dealt with complaints with respect to cable service, such as concerns about quality of service and billing until 12 April 2006, when this organisation ceased operation. Since then, complaints filed with the Commission about quality of service and billing are forwarded to the appropriate licensee [that is a cable company] for resolution." [3]

== See also ==
- Canadian Radio-television and Telecommunications Commission

== Citations ==
1. Vidéotron abandons CTSC 2. Shaw quits CTSC and Cable standards council downsizes 3. CRTC 2006
